Sherwin Tanabi (born 05 October 2001) is a Papua New Guinean professional rugby league footballer who plays as a  for the Papua New Guinea Hunters in the Queensland Cup and Papua New Guinea at international level.

Background
Tanabi was born in Morobe Province, Papua New Guinea.

Playing career

Club career
Tanabi debuted in the 2022 Queensland Cup for the PNG Hunters.

International career
In 2022 Tanabi was named in the Papua New Guinea squad for the 2021 Rugby League World Cup.

In October 2022 he made his international début for Papua New Guinea against Wales.

References

External links
Papua New Guinea Hunters profile
Papua New Guinea profile

2001 births
Living people
Papua New Guinea national rugby league team players
Papua New Guinean rugby league players
Rugby league forwards